British Racing Partnership (BRP) was a racing team, and latterly constructor, from the United Kingdom. It was established by Alfred Moss and Ken Gregory – Stirling Moss's father and former manager, respectively – in 1957 to run cars for Stirling, when not under contract with other firms, along with other up-and-coming drivers.

History

BRP ran a Cooper-Borgward Formula Two car and occasionally a BRM Formula One car in 1959, the latter being demolished in a spectacular crash at the Avus street circuit. BRP was the first Formula One team to sell the entire identity of the team in return for sponsorship income; they were sponsored by the Yeoman Credit Ltd. hire-purchase company from August 1959 and became Yeoman Credit Racing for the  season. BRP was given a sum of £40,000 just to buy their equipment plus £20,000/year to operate the team. The team ran Coopers in both Formula One and Formula Two during 1960, with mixed success. During this time four of the team's drivers were killed while racing their cars, and the Yeoman Credit management became concerned that the team was not generating solely positive publicity for their company. UDT was United Dominions Trust, who among various holdings owned Laystall Engineering, the principal supplier of crankshafts to the British automotive and aviation industries.

For , the team reverted to its original name and became a true constructor; they had been running Lotus 24s and Cooper T51s for the previous few seasons, and had tried to acquire the more modern, monocoque Lotus 25 without success.  This caused chief designer, Tony Robinson, to design his own monocoque car, patterned very closely after the Lotus 25, but with a thicker skin and running a BRM V8 rather than the typical Coventry Climax engine run in the Lotus 25.  This car is commonly referred to as the BRP-BRM and was raced by Innes Ireland and Trevor Taylor.

As a constructor, BRP took part in 13 Grand Prix rounds, scoring a total of 11 championship points. After  the team was forced to withdraw from F1 when BRP were denied membership of the Formula 1 Constructors Association  which effectively deprived them of start money, then a significant factor in a team's income. Instead, BRP was hired by Masten Gregory's stepfather George Bryant to built two cars for the 1965 Indianapolis 500, but enjoyed little success.

Complete Formula One World Championship results

As a privateer
(key)

As a constructor
(key)

Non-championship F1 results

Sources 
Forix article on BRP
Team Profile at Grand Prix Encyclopedia
F1 Database entry
Results from Formula1.com

References

Formula One constructors
Formula One entrants
British auto racing teams
British racecar constructors
24 Hours of Le Mans teams
1958 establishments in England
1966 disestablishments in England
World Sportscar Championship teams
Auto racing teams established in 1958
Auto racing teams disestablished in 1966